Miles High Music Books is a subsidiary of Miles High Records, founded in 2015, which publishes and distributes cutting-edge jazz music books, primarily the writing of Mark Sherman, a professor of Jazz at The Juilliard School in Manhattan.

The publishing company launched in the Fall of 2015 with Sherman's first book, "Skills for the Poetic Language of Jazz Improvisation, with School and Career Guidance." The book was one of the first to synthesize both musical education/training and guidance on how to implement that creative growth along with career growth starting in school and then going on to the world of a working musician.  Sherman's years as a music educator at Juilliard teaching improvisation, and his long career as a musician who has performed at the highest levels of classical, jazz, Broadway, and studio recording were the basis of the book.

Publications

2016

 "Build Your Technique and Coordination," Alessandro Napolitano (2016)

2015

 "Skills for the Poetic Language of Jazz Improvisation, with School and Career Guidance," Mark Sherman (2015)

Jazz books
Music publishing companies of the United States